The Ohio State–Penn State football rivalry is an American college football match between the Ohio State Buckeyes and the Penn State  Nittany Lions. Ohio State leads the series 23–14.

The programs met eight times prior to the 1993 season when Penn State joined the Big Ten Conference.  Since 1993, the teams have played annually, and the series continues as an annual Big Ten East division game. The rivalry is marked by several memorable games, including Penn State’s blocked field goal return for a touchdown in 2016 and Ohio State’s fourth quarter comeback in 2017.

1912–1980: Pre-Big Ten era
Penn State won the first four meetings in the series, however the games were scheduled intermittently between 1912 and 1964. The first ever match-up was held in Columbus, Ohio in November 1912. Penn State, coming off an 8–0–1 season in 1911, shut out Ohio State, 37–0. The game is officially recorded as a forfeit by Ohio State. The first contest held in State College, Pennsylvania was in 1976 where Ohio State beat Penn State, 12–7.

In 1980, the two schools played in their first and only postseason bowl, the 1980 Fiesta Bowl. Ohio State's record was 9–3, and Penn State's 10–2. Penn State won, 31–19, at Sun Devil Stadium in Tempe, Arizona. Following the game, Penn State and Ohio State did not meet again until Penn State joined the Big Ten in 1993

1993–2000: Penn State enters the Big Ten
Following the Nittany Lions joining the Big Ten, the two programs met as conference foes for the first time on October 30, 1993, in Columbus. The No. 3 Buckeyes defeated the No. 12 Nittany Lions 24–6. For the following six matchups, at both teams were rated in the top 25 of the AP Poll each year, with at least one team in the top five. In 1996, the Associated Press compared the newly minted rivalry to The Game between Harvard and Yale when speaking of the magnitude, and also saying it had developed into one of the country's biggest rivalries in just six years.

Due to the competitive nature of the games, both teams began to realize that there was uniqueness in the matchup. After only three years in the Big Ten, Buckeye players were already comparing the game to the Michigan–Ohio State football rivalry, with a player saying "Penn State's right up there with Michigan. It's definitely one of our biggest games. You can sense there was a rivalry from day one."

When the Buckeyes lost two games before meeting Penn State in 1999, one Lions player said, "It's Penn State-Ohio State. Records don't matter."

2001–2010: Paterno vs. Tressel
The 2000s saw several close games between the Buckeyes and the Nittany Lions, as they put long time Penn State head coach Joe Paterno, against Ohio State head coach Jim Tressel. Ohio State went 6–3 during this period. What would have been the Buckeyes' seventh win in 2010, along with that entire season, was vacated as a result of players receiving improper benefits. Ohio State won seven Big Ten titles, either shared or outright, in 2002 and 2005 through 2010, although Ohio State vacated the 2010 title due to improper player benefits. Penn State shared titles in 2005 and 2008 with Ohio State.

The 2001 game gave Paterno his 324th career win and the record for most wins by a coach in NCAA history. Penn State was suffering through a dismal season with a 1–4 start with Matt Senaca leading the way. Senaca was soon benched in this game where Ohio State climbed to a 27–9 lead and freshman Zack Mills helped Penn State come back and nearly saved their season (Penn State finished 5–6). The following year, Penn State would very nearly beat Ohio State in the Horseshoe, only losing 13–7 to the eventual national champions.

In 2005, Penn State was an underdog despite trouncing then-No. 18 Minnesota 44–14 the week before and being undefeated. However, Penn State played defense and shut down the Buckeye ground game.  With the help of a loud and boisterous home crowd, Penn State upset the then-favored Buckeyes 17–10 in State College. The noise level of the stadium as a factor in Ohio State's defeat gained national attention and respect for the Penn State student section, giving birth to the "Whiteout" tradition at Beaver Stadium.  The following year, the Lions were able to get on the board first and maintained a 3–0 lead at halftime. Penn State fumbled while driving for another score in the third quarter and, after a missed Penn State field goal that would have given the Lions a 6–0 lead, the Buckeyes were able to score the game's first touchdown and gain a 7–3 advantage going into the 4th quarter. Ohio State went up 14–3 when QB Troy Smith, attempting to avoid a sack, threw downfield into coverage. Wide Receiver Brian Robiskie was able to catch the pass and avert a Penn State interception. On the next drive Penn State, starting from its own 20, was able to take the ball to the Ohio State 1-yard line before being pushed back and kicking a field goal to cut the OSU lead to 8. Ohio State was able to score twice in the final two minutes of the game on a pair of interceptions thrown by Penn State QB Anthony Morelli that were returned for touchdowns to secure a 28–6 victory.

Ohio State entered the 2007 edition at Happy Valley undefeated and ranked #1 in the country. Despite the loud Penn State "whiteout" planned by the Lions' student section, the Buckeyes were able to overcome an early 7–3 deficit to win 37–17.  The 2008 meeting saw Penn State prevail 13–6 at Ohio Stadium, snapping a seven-game losing streak in the Shoe.  The Buckeyes would win in 2009 and 2010, going on to win the Big Ten title each year, but the 2010 victory was later vacated.

2011: Rivalry hit by scandal
After the 2010 season, it was revealed that several Ohio State players, most notably QB Terrelle Pryor, received improper benefits. An investigation determined that Tressel had knowledge of the situation but failed to notify the University or the NCAA. Tressel resigned his position and Ohio State vacated all of its wins from the season, including its win over Penn State, its Big Ten Title, and Sugar Bowl win.

The 2011 season began a new era in the rivalry with new additions to the Big Ten conference, as well as new head coaches for both teams.  With the addition of Nebraska into the Big Ten, the conference split into two six-team divisions.  Both Ohio State and Penn State were placed in the "Leaders" Division and will continue to play each other annually.  The 2011 season also marked a new era for the Buckeyes and Nittany Lions, as Luke Fickell was named the interim head coach for the season after Tressel's resignation and Tom Bradley after longtime Penn State head coach Joe Paterno was fired 9 games into the season following the uncovering of the Penn State child sex abuse scandal (Paterno died shortly thereafter on January 22, 2012). Both schools were ultimately handed postseason bans for the 2012 season (Penn State's ban was slated to extend through 2015, it was lifted on September 8, 2014). Ohio State vacated its wins from the 2010 season, while Penn State was forced to vacate all of its wins from 1998–2011 (although these wins were later restored in 2015).

2012–2018: Two fresh starts
Both schools had new head coaches for the 2012 season. On November 28, 2011, Ohio State hired former Utah and Florida head coach Urban Meyer as head coach, beginning a new era in the rivalry. Meyer had been considered by many, including Paterno himself, as a possible replacement for Paterno at Penn State.  Penn State eventually hired former New England Patriots offensive coordinator Bill O'Brien to succeed Paterno as head coach.

The O'Brien Era at Penn State lasted only two seasons, as he was hired as to be the head coach of the  NFL's Houston Texans in 2014.  O'Brien's Lions lost twice to the Buckeyes, with the 63–14 result in 2013 representing Penn State's worst loss, and most points scored against the team, since 1899.  O'Brien was replaced by former Vanderbilt head coach James Franklin in January 2014.   Ohio State won in Franklin's first two seasons, but in 2016, a blocked punt and blocked field goal helped Penn State upset the #2 ranked Buckeyes, 24–21. Penn State would go on to win the conference championship. In 2017, the sixth-ranked Buckeyes hosted #2 Penn State.  The Nittany Lions came into the game with best scoring defense in the country, allowing only 9.6 points per game, against an Ohio State team that led the Big 10 in scoring.  Ultimately the Buckeyes overcame a 28–10 deficit to win, 39–38, scoring the winning touchdown with 1:48 in the game. In 2018, #4 Ohio State rallied from a 26–14 deficit to defeat #9 Penn State, 27–26. The loss ended Penn State's 16-game home winning streak.

Meyer retired from Ohio State in January 2019.  Buckeyes offensive coordinator Ryan Day was announced as the next head coach. #2 Ohio State defeated #8 Penn State, 28–17, in Day's first game coaching against Penn State. The win clinched the Big Ten East Division for the Buckeyes for the 3rd straight year.

Game results

See also 
 List of NCAA college football rivalry games

References

College football rivalries in the United States
Ohio State Buckeyes football
Penn State Nittany Lions football
Big Ten Conference rivalries